Tõlliste is a village in Valga Parish,  Valga County in southern Estonia. It has a population of 105 (as of 1 January 2010). Prior to the 2017 administrative reform of Estonian local governments, Tõlliste was located in Tõlliste Parish.

References

 

Villages in Valga County